Gordon Frickers (born 1949 in Beckenham, Kent, United Kingdom) is a marine artist based in Plymouth, Devon, but also paints in France.  Frickers was the first marine artist to be exhibited at the European Parliament in Brussels in May 2011.

Education and experience
 Maidstone College of Fine Art (later part of Kent Institute of Art & Design and now part of University for the Creative Arts) and Medway College : Visual Communication, Photography for advertising & media
 Falmouth Technical College : Ship & Boat Building;
 Montmiral School of Painting (South West France)
 Plymouth College of Further Education (now City College Plymouth) : Internet, E business, web design 

In addition to being an artist, Frickers is also a master shipwright and marine and art historian. At one time he was managing director of Southeast Boat Building.

Awards and memberships
 Four times chosen Yachting World/Rolex-Swan prize artist 
 Member of the British Marine Federation
 Member of SuperyachtUK

Works
Works and series by Frickers include:

 "I have urgent dispatches" which depicts the schooner HMS Pickle conveying news of the death of Nelson and victory at Trafalgar
 "Trafalgar Dawn", the view from HMS Victory at 6:05 am on the morning of 21 October 1805 
 "Trafalgar Dawn, the French Perspective" showing the view  Vice-Admiral Villeneuve had from his flagship Bucentaure just before the battle
 1994 "Nexus", the Cable Ship Nexus commissioned by BT Marine and donated to Coe Metcalf Shipping of Liverpool, who had converted the oil drilling ship Pelican 2 to become CS Nexus 
 1991 "Cable Ship Sovereign" commissioned by BT Marine for their boardroom 
 "The Port of Chester" 
 "Royal Yacht Britannia (1893)" 
 "Uganda entering Falmouth with tugs to lay up after the Falklands war"
 "Dumra departing Bombay in a rising S.W. monsoon", for Sir Robin Knox-Johnston to celebrate Sir Robin's earliest times at sea 
 "Cunard Express Steamer The Mauretania" 
 "Plymouth Cattewater", which shows a clipper loading in the early 1880s before her imminent departure for Australia
 "HMS Formidable, Seafires Returning", painted for a lady whose husband had served as a pilot 
 "Norway", the cruise ship, leaving Miami
 The voyage of the French explorer Lapérouse series
 Historic & Picturesque Wine Villages of Bordeaux series

Some of Frickers work has been reproduced as limited edition prints

Patrons
Frickers patrons and clients include:

 The Sail Training Association (now the Tall Ships Youth Trust) 
 Caledonian MacBrayne  
 British Telecom (Marine) Ltd.
 Cunard Line
 Yamaha 
 Sir Robin Knox-Johnston
 Maiden G.B. (Tracy Edwards)
 Blue Arrow America's Cup
 The National Trust
 Imperial Tobacco (Award won)
 Devonport Management Limited
 Marine Projects (now known as Princess Yachts)
 Coe Metcalf Shipping Ltd.
 Corum - French Admiral's Cup Sponsor
 Sir Richard Branson
 Henri Lloyd Limited
 La Maire de Sauternes
 CPC (United Kingdom) Limited (name changed in 1998 to Best Foods Inc)

Exhibitions and galleries
Frickers work has been exhibited at:

 European Parliament, Brussels, May 2011 
 Buckingham Palace
 London International Boat Show
 Royal Society of Marine Artists
 Maison de la Fontaine, City of Brest
 Chester Town Hall, including a Civic Reception 
 La Mairie, L'ile sur Tarn, October, November 2007 
 1868 Restaurant, King David Street, Jerusalem, May 2007 

Frickers' wine villages of France paintings have been exhibited at Gallerie Marin in Appledore, north Devon.

Books and TV
Frickers work has appeared in:

 The Nelson Almanac edited by David Harris 
 Nelson's Ships by Peter Goodwin 
 Ships of Trafalgar by Peter Goodwin 
 Fighting Ships 1750-1850 by Sam Willis 

Frickers appeared in the 2010 TV documentary series, The Boats that Built Britain.

External links
 Gordon Frickers

Notes and references

1949 births
Living people
20th-century British painters
British male painters
21st-century British painters
British marine artists
People from Beckenham
Alumni of the University for the Creative Arts
20th-century British male artists
21st-century British male artists